In the Divergent book trilogy and film series, factions are societal divisions that classify citizens based on their aptitudes and values. The factions are Dauntless (the brave), Amity (the kind), Erudite (the intelligent), Abnegation (the selfless), and Candor (the honest). On an appointed day every year, 16-year-olds select the faction to which they will devote the rest of their lives after they take a placement test.

In an interview, Veronica Roth describes the factions to have expanded from her initial conception when she did world building. She added Candor to fill "a gap in the reasoning behind the world that needed to be filled."

Many reviews for the Divergent novels criticize the social structures that create the factions within the novel. For example, the Kirkus Reviews on the first novel called the social structure a "preposterous premise."

References

Divergent trilogy